African Identities is an academic journal that focuses primarily on subjects pertaining to African studies.

External links 
 

African studies journals
Routledge academic journals
Quarterly journals
English-language journals
Publications established in 2003